Ronald, Ron or Ronnie Clark may refer to:

Sports
 Ronald Clark (cricketer) (Ronald Disston Clark, 1895–1983), English first-class cricketer
 Ron Clark (long-distance runner) (born 1930), British runner
 Ronnie Clark (1932–2013), Scottish footballer
 Ron Clark (baseball) (Ronald Bruce Clark, born 1943), American MLB baseball infielder

Other
 Ronald W. Clark (1916–1987), British author of biography, fiction, and non-fiction
 Ronald P. Clark, United States Army general
 Ron Clark (writer) (active from 1963), American playwright and screenwriter
 Ron Clark (judge) (born 1953), United States federal judge
 Ron Clark (teacher) (born 1972), American educator who has worked with disadvantaged students; Survivor contestant
 The Ron Clark Story, a 2006 film about the teacher
 Ronnie Clark, a pseudonym used by musician Herbie Hancock

See also
 Roland Clark (born 1965), American house music DJ, producer, songwriter and vocalist
 Ronald Clarke (disambiguation)
 Ronald Clark O'Bryan (AKA The Candy Man and The Man Who Killed Halloween, 1944–1984), American murderer
 Roland E. Clark (sometimes misreported as "Ronald"; 1911–1972), American doctor suspected of being a serial killer